Walter Ian Reid Fraser, Baron Fraser of Tullybelton,  (3 February 1911 – 17 February 1989) was a British judge.

Life and career
Ian Fraser was born in Glasgow on 3 February 1911, the only child of Alexander Reid Fraser, a Glasgow fur merchant, and his wife Margaret Russell MacFarlane. He was educated at Sandroyd School, Repton School and later studied Philosophy, Politics and Economics at Balliol College, Oxford, graduating in 1932 with First Class Honours. He finished his studies at the University of Glasgow with a Bachelor of Laws in 1935. The following year he was admitted to the Scottish Faculty of Advocates, where he soon earned a reputation as an excellent jurist. At the same time he held a teaching post at the University of Glasgow and from 1948 at the University of Edinburgh. His 1936 work "Outline of Constitutional Law" (2nd edition 1948) was soon regarded as the standard work on British constitutional law.

During the war he served first as a sergeant in an anti-aircraft battery of the Territorial Army. Later he transferred to the Royal Artillery, was promoted to the rank of major and served in the theatre of war in Burma. In 1945 he was appointed Advocate Depute and eventually rose to be the Home Depute in the Crown Office. In 1953 he was appointed QC. In 1954 he served on the Scottish Law Reform Committee and from 1960 to 1962 on the Royal Commission on the Police. From 1959 to 1964 he served as Dean of the Faculty of Advocates. From 1964 to 1974, he was a Senator of the College of Justice and had the judicial courtesy title of Lord Fraser. In 1974 he was appointed to the Privy Council, and on 13 January 1975 was created a life peer with the title Baron Fraser of Tullybelton, of Bankfoot in the County of Perth, and took the office of Lord of Appeal in Ordinary.

Fraser was a very active member of the House of Lords and dealt primarily with issues of further development of the administration of justice. Even in his retirement, he was a chairman of the University Commission on the reform of higher education. He died on 17 February 1989 in a car crash on the M90 motorway between Perth and Edinburgh during a snow storm.

Awards and honours
Fraser was a member of the Royal Company of Archers. In 1975 he was appointed honorary chairman of the administrative committee of Gray's Inn, where he was an Honorary Bencher. In 1981 he was made an Honorary Fellow of Balliol College. He was awarded honorary doctorates (Legum Doctor) at the University of Glasgow in 1970 and at the University of Edinburgh in 1978.

Family
On 8 November 1943 Fraser married Mary Ursula Cynthia Gwendolen Macdonnell, daughter of Colonel Ian Harrison Macdonnell, with whom he had a son, Andrew.

Judgments

Lord Fraser overturned, along with Lord Edmund-Davies, Lord Roskill, Lord Brandon, and Lord Templeman, the Mandla v Dowell-Lee judgment by Lord Denning in the House of Lords, where he held the following with respect to the Race Relations Act 1976:

He went on to approve the test set out by Richardson, J. in the County Court, which held that Sikhs were a racial or ethnic group:

Notes

References

1911 births
1989 deaths
Fraser of Tullybelton, Ian Fraser, Baron
People educated at Sandroyd School
People educated at Repton School
Alumni of Balliol College, Oxford
Alumni of the University of Glasgow
Academics of the University of Glasgow
Academics of the University of Edinburgh
Members of the Privy Council of the United Kingdom
Members of the Judicial Committee of the Privy Council
Senior Lords of Appeal in Ordinary
Members of the Royal Company of Archers
Royal Artillery officers
Fraser
Deans of the Faculty of Advocates
British Army personnel of World War II
British Army soldiers
Road incident deaths in Scotland